San Narciso, officially the Municipality of San Narciso, is a 3rd class municipality in the province of Quezon, Philippines. According to the 2020 census, it has a population of 51,058 people.

Geography

Barangays
San Narciso has 24 barangays, 4 in Poblacion area.

Climate

Demographics

Economy

References

External links
San Narciso Profile at PhilAtlas.com
[ Philippine Standard Geographic Code]
Philippine Census Information
Local Governance Performance Management System

Municipalities of Quezon